The Zaochiao Charcoal Museum is a museum about charcoal in Zaoqiao Township, Miaoli County, Taiwan.

Architecture
The museum building is a two-story building. The first floor is the meeting room, shop, DIY charcoal art area, charcoal art display area and a café. The second floor is the themed exhibition area.

Exhibition
 Charcoal science
 Charcoal history
 Future of charcoal exploration
 Charcoal and health

See also
 List of museums in Taiwan

References

Museums with year of establishment missing
Museums in Miaoli County
Industry museums in Taiwan
Charcoal